Steve Darcis and Olivier Rochus were the defending champions, but decided not to compete.

Andrey Kuznetsov and Adrián Menéndez-Maceiras won the title, defeating Alessandro Motti and Matteo Viola in the final, 4–6, 6–3, [10–8].

Seeds

Draw

Draw

References
 Main Draw

Prosperita Openandnbsp;- Doubles
2014 Doubles